The 1968 United States Senate election in Kentucky took place on November 5, 1968. Incumbent Republican U.S. Senator Thruston Morton retired from office. Jefferson County Judge (the equivalent of a County Executive) Marlow Cook won the open seat.

Republican primary

Candidates
 Marlow Cook, Jefferson County Judge
 Eugene Siler, former U.S. Representative
 Thurman Jerome Hamlin, perennial candidate
 E. W. Kemp

Results

Democratic primary

Candidates
 Katherine Peden, Commissioner of Commerce
 John Y. Brown Sr., former U.S. Representative
 Foster Ockerman, former State Representative
 Ted Osborn,  State Representative

Results

General election

Results

See also 
 1968 United States Senate elections

References

1968
Kentucky
United States Senate